Chemical elements that have been mistakenly "discovered". Further investigation showed that their discovery was either mistaken, that they have been mistaken from an already-known element, or mixture of two elements, or that they indicated a failing in theory where a new element had been assumed rather than some previously unknown behaviour.

References 

 
Chemistry-related lists